Luis Moglia Barth (12 April 1903 - 18 June 1984) was an Argentine film director and screenwriter, and one of the influential directors in the Cinema of Argentina of the classic era. He directed some 30 films between 1927 and 1959, often screenwriting for his pictures. He died in Buenos Aires, aged 81.

Filmography
Director:

 Puños, chárleston y besos (1927)  
 El 90 (1928)  
 Consejo de tango (1932)  
 ¡Tango! (1933)  
 Dancing (1933)  
 Riachuelo (1934)  
 Picaflor (1935)  
 Amalia (1936)  
 Santos Vega (1936)  
 ¡Goal! (1936)  
 Melgarejo (1937)  
 La casa de Quirós (1937)  
 Melodías porteñas (1937)  
 El último encuentro (1938) 
 Paths of Faith (1938)
 Doce mujeres (1939) 
 Una mujer de la calle (1939)  
 Huella (1940)  
 Con el dedo en el gatillo (1940)  
 Confesión (1940)  
 Hogar, dulce hogar(1941)  
 Fortín Alto (1941)  
 Boina blanca (1941)  
 Cruza (1942)  
 Ponchos azules (1942)  
 María Rosa (1946)  
 La senda oscura (1947)  
 Não Me Digas Adeus (1947)  
 Juan Moreira (1948)  
 Edición Extra (1949)  
 The New Bell (1950)  
 La fuerza ciega (1950)  
 La Doctora Castañuelas (1950)  
 Intermezzo criminal (1953)  
 Dringue, Castrito y la lámpara de Aladino (1954)  
 El cura de la sierra (1959) (TV)

External links
 

1903 births
1984 deaths
Argentine film directors
Male screenwriters
Writers from Buenos Aires
Argentine people of Italian descent
Argentine people of German descent
20th-century Argentine screenwriters
20th-century Argentine male writers